Paul Clark Eddington  (18 June 1927 – 4 November 1995) was an English actor best known for playing Jerry Leadbetter in the television sitcom The Good Life (1975–78) and politician Jim Hacker in the sitcom Yes Minister (1980–84) and its sequel, Yes, Prime Minister (1986–88).

Early life
Eddington was born at Paddington in London to decorative artist Albert Clark Eddington and Frances Mary (née Roberts); he was raised in St John's Wood. The family were Quakers – Albert Clark Eddington being related to the Somerset shoemaking Clark family and the scientist Sir Arthur Eddington – and Eddington was brought up by his parents with strict family values. 

His father had been "emotionally shattered" on his return from the First World War, which led to Eddington being a life-long pacifist. Eddington attended Sibford School, Sibford Ferris, Oxfordshire. In 1952, he married Patricia (née Scott).

Career
Having registered as a conscientious objector, Eddington began his acting career as a teenager with Entertainments National Service Association (ENSA) during the Second World War. He worked for Sheffield Repertory Theatre, a theatre company based at Sheffield Playhouse. In 1956, he played his first major role on television as the corrupt policeman PC Tom Carr in the Dixon of Dock Green episode The Rotten Apple,  and later that year he became a regular cast member of The Adventures of Robin Hood. Initially he played minor characters, but in the fourth season (1959–60), he played Will Scarlet. 

He had a leading role in 'Liberty Bar', a 1960 episode of "Maigret", BBC TV series, playing 'Harry Brown', an Australian entrepreneur. He had roles in episodes of The Avengers (1963), The Prisoner (1967) and the final episode of The Champions (1969). He was a main cast member of the television series Frontier (1968). He also had a supporting role in Hammer Films' The Devil Rides Out (1968), an episode of Van der Valk in 1972, and appeared as a "straight man" (substituting for regular stooge Henry McGee) in a 1976 episode of The Benny Hill Show. He also appeared in most episodes of the ATV series Hine (1971). In this he played Astor Harris, a member of an arms-dealing firm named Pendles. Eddington appeared as civil servant Strand in the last series of Special Branch (1974).

Career peak
Although he was an actor for all his adult life, it was not until Eddington was in his late forties that he became a household name because of his role in The Good Life, first screened by the BBC in 1975, and written by John Esmonde and Bob Larbey. The sitcom focuses on a suburban couple who decide to give up conventionally paid work and become self-sufficient in their suburban garden. Eddington was cast as Jerry Leadbetter, a neighbour of the main characters, and Penelope Keith played his wife, Margo. Originally intended as small parts, the Leadbetters soon became essential foils for the two stars. He also appeared in a single episode of another Esmonde and Larbey sitcom, Get Some In! in 1977.

Eddington's profile was raised further when he played the title role of Jim Hacker in the comedy series Yes Minister (1980–84) and Yes, Prime Minister (1986–88). He was shortlisted four times for the BAFTA award for Best Light Entertainment Performance for the series, but he lost out to his co-star Nigel Hawthorne on each occasion.

During 1987 Eddington appeared as Sir Joseph Porter in H.M.S. Pinafore in Australia. His last roles included Guy Wheeler, a corrupt property developer in the Minder episode The Wrong Goodbye (1989); as Richard Cuthbertson alongside Good Life co-star Felicity Kendal in the TV dramatisation of The Camomile Lawn (1992); the voice of Badger in The Adventures of Mole and Justice Shallow in Henry IV (1995); a BBC adaptation of Shakespeare's Henry IV, Part 1 and Henry IV, Part 2. He was reunited with another Good Life co-star Richard Briers in a run of the play Home in 1994.

Eddington read extracts from Sir Winston Churchill's A History of the English-Speaking Peoples for the award-winning BBC Radio series This Sceptred Isle; he died midway through the production, and his place was taken by Peter Jeffrey.

Awards and honours
Eddington was made a Commander of the Order of the British Empire (CBE) in the 1987 New Year Honours.

Final years and death
Eddington's autobiography, So Far, So Good, was published in 1995. On 30 October 1995 (five days before Eddington's death), the BBC aired an edition of Face to Face in which he discussed his life, career and battle with lymphoma. On that show he was asked how he would like to be remembered: 

Eddington had been diagnosed with a rare form of cancer, known as mycosis fungoides, when he was 28. The ailment was to cause his death eventually, but in the intervening four decades, Eddington and his immediate family kept his condition private. It only became public knowledge in 1994, when Eddington responded to press speculation about his darkening skin and hair loss.

Eddington died in Southwark, London, on 4 November 1995. He and Patricia, his wife of 43 years, had three sons and a daughter.

Selected filmography

References

Further reading

External links 
 

1927 births
1995 deaths
20th-century English male actors
20th-century Quakers
British conscientious objectors
Commanders of the Order of the British Empire
Deaths from cancer in England
Deaths from lymphoma
English autobiographers
English male stage actors
English male television actors
English pacifists
English Quakers
Entertainments National Service Association personnel
Male actors from London
People educated at Sibford School
British male comedy actors
English conscientious objectors